The following is a sortable list of the mountains and hills of Malaysia.

List of mountains

See also
List of hill stations in Malaysia
List of volcanoes in Malaysia

External links
List of mountains from S.O.S Malaysia 
List of mountains from OGKL
List of mountains from Gunung Online
Diagram of Malaysian mountain ranges

 
M
Mountains
Malaysia